Stairs and Flowers is a single by the band Skinny Puppy from the album Mind: The Perpetual Intercourse.

The song makes use of extensive samples from an episode of the radio drama The Cabinet of Dr. Fritz, titled "Sticks".

Track listing

References

External links
 
 Stairs and Flowers music video

1987 singles
Skinny Puppy songs
Capitol Records singles
1986 songs
Songs written by cEvin Key
Songs written by Nivek Ogre
Songs written by Dwayne Goettel
Songs written by Dave Ogilvie